Oscar De Pellegrin (born 17 May 1963) is an Italian Paralympic archer and former Paralympic sports shooter. At the 2022 Italian local elections, he has been elected mayor of Belluno.

Biography
His disability is due to a tractor accident at the family farm. He began in sport in 1990 due to a friend. He has been one of the main athletes of the "Nazionale Sport Disabili" (Disabled Italian National Team) for archery, and shooting. In the two sports he achieved 70 Italian titles, 11 Italian records and 4 world records.

In 2000, after winning the Team Gold Medal at the Olympics, he's been decorated with the title of commendatore of the Italian Republic, while the Italian National Olympic Committee gave him their highest honorary medal, the "collare d'oro" (literally, the golden collar).

On the occasion of the journey of the Olympic Flame of Turin 2006, Oscar has been chosen as the last torch-bearer of Belluno's leg, and he lighted up the tripod in the city's main plaza. In  2012 he's been Italy's flag bearer at the Paralympic Games in London.

Archery 
Archery is the only sport where there are no distinctions between able-bodied and disabled athletes. Due to this peculiarity, in 1993 and 1994 Oscar became part of the Italian National Team.
He represented Italy at the Paralympic Games in Barcelona (1992), Atlanta (1996), Sydney (2000), Athens (2004), Beijing, (2008) and London (2012), for a total of 6 editions.
In 2009 he won a Guinness World Record together with Marco Vitale and Alberto Simonelli, shooting light bulbs.

References

External links
 

1963 births
Living people
Italian male archers
Italian male sport shooters
Paralympic archers of Italy
Paralympic shooters of Italy
Paralympic gold medalists for Italy
Paralympic bronze medalists for Italy
Paralympic medalists in archery
Paralympic medalists in shooting
Shooters at the 1992 Summer Paralympics
Shooters at the 1996 Summer Paralympics
Archers at the 2000 Summer Paralympics
Archers at the 2008 Summer Paralympics
Archers at the 2012 Summer Paralympics
Medalists at the 1992 Summer Paralympics
Medalists at the 1996 Summer Paralympics
Medalists at the 2000 Summer Paralympics
Medalists at the 2008 Summer Paralympics
Medalists at the 2012 Summer Paralympics
People from Belluno
Sportspeople from the Province of Belluno